Zapovednik (plural , from the Russian , 'sacred, prohibited from disturbance, committed [to protect], committed [to heritage]') is an established term on the territory of the former Soviet Union for a protected area which is kept "forever wild". It is the highest degree of environmental protection for the assigned areas, which are strictly protected and access to the public is restricted.

Overview
The literal English translation of zapovednik is "nature sanctuary" (like animal sanctuary); however, in practice, zapovedniks sometimes have to do with the protection of things other than nature and can incorporate historical-cultural, historical–archaeological, and other types of cultural or natural heritage. They also function as important sites for historical research and education and so are comparable to the Sites of Special Scientific Interest as found in the United Kingdom and Hong Kong.

The term zapovednik, which refers to the reserve, staff and infrastructure, was used in the former Soviet Union and is still in use in the Russian Federation and in some of the other former Soviet republics. Many reserves have areas with different degrees of protection; sometimes grazing is permitted to a certain extent.

Other types of protected areas include national nature parks, zakazniks (referring to "state game reserve"  because a limited amount of hunting is allowed there), nature monuments (often individual trees, geological exposures, or other small areas), etc. Some zapovedniks are recognized as biosphere reserves (or sanctuaries).

The Russian Ministry of Natural Resources oversees 99 of the zapovedniks. The exception is Il'menskiy, which is administered by the Russian Academy of Sciences, and Galich'ya Gora, administered by Voronezh State University.

Theory of zapovednost'
The theoretical justification for the zapovedniks is known as zapovednost (заповедность) – meaning "the state of being protected in a zapovednik". It was developed in the 1890s and early 20th century, principally by the soil biologist Vasily Dokuchaev.

The fundamental idea of zapovednost''' is the exclusion of people and the prohibition of economic activity, the only exceptions being non-intrusive access allowed to scientists and rangers. Zapovedniks are intended to be parcels of untouched natural ecosystems that can be studied as standards with which to compare managed ecosystems, such as are created in agriculture and forestry. To this end, zapovedniks need to be large enough to be self-sufficient, with a complete range of trophic levels up to the top predators.

In 1910 the theory of zapovednost was taken a step forward by I. P. Borodin, who argued that zapovedniks should not be established piecemeal, but as a planned system of reserves including samples of all the main natural regions in the country.

In the 1940s Aldo Leopold understood the need for zapovednik-type reserves: "While even the largest wilderness areas become partially deranged, it required only a few wild acres for J. E. Weaver to discover why the prairie flora is more drought-resistant than the agronomic flora which has supplanted it." The answer was that the wild prairie had a much more complex, and more efficient, root system, and this could only have been discovered by studying the undisturbed natural ecosystem.

Of course it would be difficult, if not impossible, to establish a 'perfect' zapovednik today, entirely natural and self-sufficient, especially in view of downstream effects involving pollution and greenhouse gases. Nevertheless, many Russian zapovedniks are a good approximation to the ideal and have been operating as scientific institutions for many decades.

History
The first zapovedniks were set up in the steppe region of the Russian Empire in the 1890s. Some were equipped with research stations. Dokuchaev was the guiding spirit behind these early zapovedniks. Areas of steppe were chosen for the first zapovedniks because of the rapid disappearance of virgin steppe as it was ploughed up, and because it was thought that ploughing might be exacerbating the effects of drought; clearly, research was needed in order to understand the steppe and how it could be best exploited.

The applied-science motivation for setting up zapovedniks was continued in the first state-organized zapovednik. Barguzin Nature Reserve was established by the tsarist government in 1916 on the eastern shore of Lake Baikal. Its purpose was to protect and study a population of sable – a valuable fur species that was declining due to over-hunting. Other zapovedniks appear to have been set up at about the same time but either lapsed (e.g. Sayan) or did not receive formal recognition until later.Shtilmark (2003), pp.24-25.

Lenin's nationalization of the land in 1917 and 1918 created a legally favourable environment for the Soviet zapovednik system since securing areas of land for this purpose from private owners was no longer a problem.

The recognition of zapovedniks was put on a firm legal footing by a measure "On the Protection of Nature Monuments, Gardens and Parks", signed into law by Lenin in 1921. The creation of zapovedniks continued, but the measure also allowed for the establishment of national parks, though none were set up in the Soviet Union for another half century.

By 1933 there were 15 state zapovedniks in Russia, and by 1995, there were 115. The average area of new zapovedniks declined from 780 km2 in 1916–25 to 110 km2 in 1936–45, and then rose to 5,060 km2 in 1986–95. In 2007 there were 101 operating zapovedniks, reflecting a small number of new ones opened since 1995, but also two periods of closures and contraction of the system. The first of these was planned by Aleksandr Malinovskii; it was carried out in 1951 with a view to turning the zapovedniks into "commercial-and-research" institutions as well as releasing substantial areas of protected forest for commercial exploitation. Over the next 10 years the zapovednik system recovered somewhat, but in 1961 Nikita Khrushchev criticized it, famously referring to a film about them  in which a scientist was shown watching a squirrel gnawing a nut. Six zapovedniks were closed and others were amalgamated or reduced in area.

Although in theory a zapovednik is an extensive area of unspoilt natural ecosystems used for scientific research with a residential staff of scientists and rangers, the history of many zapovedniks has in fact been rather different, sometimes involving closure, exploitation (including the felling of forest), and eventual reopening. Even so, some zapovedniks have had an almost unblemished history and most retain the original vision of being scientific research institutions not open to public recreation.

Environments protected

It is not easy to summarize the coverage of ecosystems protected by zapovedniks, but a rough idea can be gained by counting the number of reserves in the main natural-vegetation zones. On the map these are, from north to south:
 Arctic desert (treeless; no continuous vegetation cover) and tundra (treeless; small shrubs, sedges, mosses)
 taiga (coniferous boreal forest with admixture of birch and other deciduous trees)
 deciduous forest (discontinuous zone dominated by oak and other deciduous species)
 steppe (treeless, dominated by forbs in the north and grasses in the south).
This is a highly simplistic classification. Each major zone is divided into subzones, and there are transitional vegetation types. Moreover, many zapovedniks, especially if in a transitional zone or covering a range of altitudes, will contain examples of several vegetation types.

With those qualifications, the numbers of zapovednik sites (some zapovedniks occupy widely dispersed sites, some of which are here counted separately) in the different zones are as follows: Arctic desert and tundra – c.15; taiga – c.40; deciduous forest – c.13; steppe – c.30. About half a dozen are predominantly montane, especially in the Caucasus. Komandorsky and Wrangel Island are remote islands. A few are mainly wetlands.

Management and uses
Although the principle of zapovednost' stipulates no economic use, in practice zapovedniks have often been required to contribute to the national economy. Voronezh Zapovednik, for instance, bred European beavers for reintroduction to other areas in support of the fur industry. Several zapovedniks have also been regarded as a breeding ground for other commercially valuable fur-bearing animals, such as sable and desman, allowing them to spread into neighboring unprotected areas to support commercial trapping.

Non-intervention management is difficult to practise in steppe zapovedniks, which are often far too small to support a self-sustaining ecosystem including wild herbivores (such as saiga) that may have been migratory. Resort is sometimes made to various mowing regimes, which however cannot satisfactorily replace natural processes insofar as it does not recycle nutrients and organic matter through the herbivore and carnivore food chain, and cannot replicate trampling effects.

An important activity in all zapovedniks is regular monitoring of seasonal events (phenology). This is now standardized in a programme of observations known as the Chronicle of Nature (Летопись природы). The name was suggested by Aleksandr Formozov in 1937 although a monitoring programme was being developed by V.N.Sukachev in 1914 and Grigorii Kozhevnikov in 1928. Instructions for conducting the Chronicle of Nature are periodically updated.

Under the pressure to become self-financing, some zapovedniks have tried at various times to develop ecological tourism - usually in the reserve's buffer zone, so avoiding infringement of the principle of zapovednost'. In some cases tourism does however become a serious problem on account of the proximity of recreation centres, e.g. at Teberdinsky Zapovednik in the Caucasus. The Dombai recreation center, long a favorite Russian alpine skiing destination, is located near the center of the zapovednik, and the impact of tourism in the area as more Russians and foreigners come to visit has created pressure on the preserved ecosystems around it.

International significance of the zapovednik system
The anthropogenic impact on the environment - due to pollution, climate change and ultimately human population growth - is generating increasingly serious problems, the solution of which will depend on a better understanding of the biosphere than we already have. To provide conditions in which such an understanding can be developed, it is essential to preserve as far as possible intact examples of natural ecosystems, and the zapovedniks are the only large system of protected areas created primarily for this purpose. In the case of soil erosion, for example, it is only by comparing soil formation and loss rates from intact steppe or prairie and from the same kind of land under intensive agriculture that we can appreciate how destructive of natural capital the latter often is.

Regular long-term monitoring of natural phenomena in zapovedniks has also provided a baseline set of data which is now valuable for assessing how anthropogenic pressure, primarily through climate change, is affecting natural ecosystems. Since the latter perform essential functions such as carbon sequestration and nutrient cycling, it is obviously important to know how these ecosystem services are being affected by anthropogenic pressure. There is an argument for establishing a well-funded global network of zapovedniks in order to increase our understanding of anthropogenic pressures on all the natural ecosystems of the world.

List of Nature Reserves ("Zapovedniks") in Russia

 UNESCO protection 

 Biosphere reserves 
Since 1978, more than thirty of Russia's nature reserves have been designated by UNESCO as biosphere reserves.

World Heritage Sites
Some of the nature reserves in Russia are also protected by the UNESCO as natural World Heritage Sites:
 Lake Baikal (includes Barguzin, Baikal-Lena, Baikal Zapovedniks, three national parks and others protected areas);
 Western Caucasus (includes Caucasus Biosphere Reserve, others protected areas;in perspective also parts of Teberda Biosphere Reserve and Sochi National Park);
 Sikhote-Alin (includes Sikhote-Alin Zapovednik and others territories);
 Golden Mountains of Altai (includes Altai and Katun zapovedniks and others protected areas);
 Volcanoes of Kamchatka (includes Kronotski Zapovednik and four regional nature parks);
 Curonian Spit (includes Curonian Spit National Park);
 Virgin Komi Forests (includes Pechora-Ilych Biosphere Reserve and National Park «Yugyd va»);
 Uvs Nuur basin (includes Uvs Nuur Nature Reserve);
 Wrangel Island (includes Wrangel Island Zapovednik).
Typically, a nature reserve occupies only a part of the much larger World Heritage site.

See also
 List of national parks of Russia

References
Notes

Sources
 Filonov, K.P. & Nukhimovskaya, Yu. D. (1990) Letopis' prirody v zapovednikakh SSSR: metodicheskoye posobiye. Moscow: Nauka. .
 Kokorin, A.O., Kozharinov, A.V. & Minin A.A. (2001) Climate Change Impact on Ecosystems. Moscow: WWF. .
 Leopold, Aldo (1968) Sand County Almanac. London (&c): Oxford University Press. .
 Montgomery, D.R. Dirt: the Erosion of Civilizations. Berkeley (&c): University of California Press. .
 Shtil'mark, F.R. (2003) History of the Russian Zapovedniks 1895-1995. Edinburgh: Russian Nature Press. .
 Volkov, A.E. (ed.) (1996) Strict Nature Reserves (Zapovedniki) of Russia: Collection of Chronicle of Nature data for 1991-1992. Moscow: Sabashnikov Publishers. .
 Weiner, D.R. (1999) A Little Corner of Freedom: Russian Nature Protection from Stalin to Gorbachev. Berkeley: University of California Press. .
 Weiner, D.R. (2000) Models of Nature: Ecology, Conservation & Cultural Revolution in Soviet Russia (2nd edition). Pittsburgh Pa: University of Pittsburgh Press. .
 Zapovedniks, under "Russian Protected Areas," at russianconservation.org, retrieved December 19, 2005.

External links

 Wild-russia.org: Descriptions of 47 Zapovedniks and National Parks — text and images, arranged by bio-region. —Rusnatpress.org: List of Russian Zapovedniks — with brief descriptions, contact details, and map coordinates.
 —Oopt.info/zp: Tsentr dikoy prirody — lists all Zapovedniks, with maps and images.''
 Isar.org: "Russia's Zapovednik System Reaches Out."
 Russianconservation.org: "Taking the Future of Russia's Protected Areas in Their Own Hands: Zapovednik Directors Meet in Vladivostok."
 —Altai-republic.ru: The Altai Reserve

 
Z
Nature conservation in Russia
.
Russia
Russia geography-related lists
.
Nature reserves

ru:Заповедник